Huang Wenjuan (born 9 December 2004) is a Chinese para table tennis player. She won the silver medal in the women's individual C8 event at the 2020 Summer Paralympics held in Tokyo, Japan. She also won the gold medal in the women's team C6–8 event.

References

Living people
2004 births
Chinese female table tennis players
Paralympic table tennis players of China
Paralympic gold medalists for China
Paralympic silver medalists for China
Paralympic medalists in table tennis
Table tennis players at the 2020 Summer Paralympics
Medalists at the 2020 Summer Paralympics
Place of birth missing (living people)
21st-century Chinese women